Edmund Ezra Day (December 7, 1883 – March 23, 1951) was an American educator.

Day received his undergraduate and master's degrees from Dartmouth College and his doctorate in economics from Harvard. While at Dartmouth, he became a brother of Theta Delta Chi.  In 1921 he was elected as a Fellow of the American Statistical Association. In 1923 he went to the University of Michigan, where he served as professor of economics, organizer and first dean of the School of Business Administration, and Dean of the University. He went on to serve as the fifth president of Cornell University from 1937 to 1949.  While in office, he helped establish the School of Industrial and Labor Relations at Cornell.

The administrative building at Cornell, Day Hall, is named after Edmund Ezra Day.  He was interred in Sage Chapel on Cornell's campus.

References

External links
 Cornell Presidency: Edmund Ezra Day
 Cornell University Library Presidents Exhibition: Edmund Ezra Day (Presidency; Inauguration)
Guide to the Edmund Ezra Day arbitration files, 1949. #5094. Kheel Center for Labor-Management Documentation and Archives, Cornell University Library.

1883 births
1951 deaths
Dartmouth College alumni
Harvard Graduate School of Arts and Sciences alumni
Presidents of Cornell University
University of Michigan faculty
Fellows of the American Statistical Association
Burials at Sage Chapel
20th-century American academics